Violeta Ivanova (Виолета Иванова) is a Bulgarian astronomer.

She is credited by the Minor Planet Center with the discovery of 14 asteroids between 1984 and 1988. She works at the Institute of Astronomy, Bulgarian Academy of Sciences and has made her discoveries at the Smolyan Observatory, which became the Rozhen National Observatory (at the Mount of Rozhen in the Rhodopes) some time after 2002. The Koronian asteroid 4365 Ivanova was named after her on 25 August 1991.

She sometimes signs Violeta G. Ivanova. She should not be confused with V. V. Ivanova (who also signs V. F. Ivanova), now of the Institute of Physics, University of St. Petersburg, St. Petergof, Russia, previously with the Institut Geokhimii i Analiticheskoi Khimii (Vernadskii Institute of Geochemistry and Analytical Chemistry), Moscow.

References 
 

Bulgarian astronomers
Discoverers of asteroids

Living people
People from Shumen Province
Year of birth missing (living people)
Women astronomers